Woman is the solo debut album by British musician Mike McGear (spelled Michael on the cover), brother of former Beatle Paul McCartney, who also co-wrote a song, but is credited as a "friend". Roger McGough produced and co-wrote some songs with McGear. Woman was initially released on Island Records in April 1972, failing to chart though it received receptive reviews. The cover is a black-and-white photo of McGear/McCartney's mother, Mary McCartney.

Track listing 
All songs by Mike McGear & Roger McGough, except where noted.

 "Woman" – 3:02
 "Witness" – 4:11
 "Jolly Good Show" / "Benna"+ – 3:25
 "Roamin a Road" / "Benna (Reprise)"+ (Mike McGear) – 2:30
 "Sister" (McGear) – 3:11
 "Wishin" – 3:21
 "Young Young Man (Five Years Ago)" / "Young Young Man (Five Years Later)" – 3:36
 "Edward Heath" (McGear) – 0:55
 "Bored as Butterscotch" (McGear, Roger McGough, Friend) – 2:50
 "Uptowndowntown" / "Blackbeauty"+ (McGear) – 3:10
 "Tiger" / "Strawberry Jam" – 7:20

+ short connecting pieces missing from the Edsel CD

Personnel 
Mike McGear – vocals
Roger McGough – guitars
Andy Roberts – guitars
Roger Bunn – bass guitar
Dave Richards – bass guitar
Zoot Money – piano, keyboards
John Megginson – organ
Brian Auger – keyboards
Norman Yardley – harmonica
Gerry Conway – drums, percussion
Ginger Johnson – percussion
Michael Rosen – horns
Roger Ball – horns
Cecil Moss – horns
Chris Pyne – horns
Malcolm Duncan – horns
Paul Korda – backing vocals
Steve Gould – backing vocals
Alan Gorrie – backing vocals
Centipede – strings
Tony Coe – saxophones

References

1972 debut albums
Mike McGear albums
Island Records albums
Albums produced by Roger McGough